The Northeast River is a tributary of the Chesapeake Bay in Maryland. The river is fed by North East Creek and its tributaries, which reach as far north as just east of Nottingham, Pennsylvania. The Northeast River is entirely within Cecil County, Maryland, though its watershed extends into Chester County, Pennsylvania. On the 1612 John Smith map, it was referred to as Gunter's Harbour.

References

Tributaries of the Chesapeake Bay
Rivers of Maryland
Rivers of Cecil County, Maryland
Rivers of Chester County, Pennsylvania
Rivers of Pennsylvania